Corsicana is a 2022 American Western film, featuring Isaiah Washington in his directorial debut. The film was co-written by Washington and Robert Johnson, and stars Washington alongside Noel Gugliemi, Lew Temple, and Stacey Dash. Washington portrays Bass Reeves, a former slave who went on to become the first noted black deputy U.S. Marshal, as he tracks an outlaw gang to Corsicana, Texas.

Synopsis
"Deputy U.S. Marshal Bass Reeves reunites with his former partner turned fugitive Sam Tanner. They find themselves in a race against time as they track Jack Donner and his vicious gang of outlaws to the oil-rich town of Corsicana."

Cast
 Isaiah Washington as Bass Reeves
 Thomas Q. Jones as Young Bass Reeves
 Lew Temple as Jack Donner
 Noel Guglielmi as Juan
 Stacey Dash as Jennie
 Billy Blair as Miller
 Amber McNutt as Doak

Production and release
Washington was first informed of the project by actor Robert Davi; with Washington becoming enthralled by Bass Reeves after having a conversation with a woman who had been attempting to produce the project. Washington offered to direct the work, after production almost ceased due to internal disputes surrounding the film.

In September 2020, Deadline reported that Washington was directing Corsicana, a film based on the life of Bass Reeves, with filming currently underway. The film features the city Corsicana, Texas, with screenwriter Robert Johnson noting that he wanted "to bring something to the city of Corsicana, a city I love...Bass Reeves never set foot in Corsicana and that's why it's historical fiction but I did want to pay homage to Corsicana.

The film received a limited theatrical release in August 2022, in Texas. Washington promoted the film's release in Chicago, hosting screenings, meet and greet, and Q&A events.

Reception
On review aggregator Rotten Tomatoes, the film has received just two reviews, both of which are positive.

Awards and nominations

Sources

Western (genre) films
Corsicana, Texas
Historical fiction
2022 films